The Little Vampire may refer to:

The Little Vampire (book series) 
The Little Vampire (film)
The Little Vampire (TV series)
The Little Vampire 3D, 2017 animated film
Little Vampire, 2020 animated film